Joseph Bullman is an English documentary and drama director, known for his political films, including factual dramas Killed By My Debt (2018), The Left Behind (2019) and Life and Death in the Warehouse (2022), and documentaries The Man Who Bought Mustique (2000), The Seven Sins of England (2007) and The Secret History of Our Streets (2012-14). Bullman's films have received six BAFTA nominations.

Career 
The Man Who Bought Mustique (2000), about Lord Glenconner, an English lord, was nominated for BAFTA and Royal Television Society (RTS) awards and was a favourite of David Bowie's.

England is Mine/Dogumentary (2002), made with Lars von Trier’s Dogme 95 movement, is a film about an English football hooligan finding love and redemption at the 2002 FIFA World Cup in Japan.

The Seven Sins of England (2007), shot in Bullman’s home town, filmed modern day binge drinkers and hooligans delivering the real words of Edwardian yobs, 12th century binge drinkers and Victorian louts. It was BAFTA-nominated and won the Grierson Innovation Award and a RTS Award.

Each episode of The Secret History of Our Streets (2012-14) depicted the history of a single London street. It was BAFTA-nominated and won a RTS award for the Best History Series and the Grierson Audience Award.

In 2018 Bullman turned to scripted drama, dramatising real life stories. His first drama, Killed by my Debt (2018), was the true story of Jerome Rogers, a young gig economy worker, who, overwhelmed by the pressure of debt arising from two traffic fines, took his own life. The film led to a national campaign and calls for reform in the UK Parliament. It won the BAFTA and RTS awards for Best Single Drama, and Broadcast awards for Best Single Drama, Best Digital Drama and Best Multichannel Drama. Bullman dedicated the BAFTA to Rogers' family who campaigned for a change to the law.

The Left Behind (2019) tells the story of Gethin, who, with no secure job, housing or future, gets drawn into a far-right hate crime. The film is based on research in Britain’s ‘left behind’ communities, and the work of professor Hilary Pilkington, who spent three years embedded with an English Defence League group. The film won BAFTA and RTS awards for Best Single Drama, and was nominated for five BAFTA Cymru awards – Best Television Drama, Best Director: Fiction, Best Actor, Best Screenplay, Best Make Up.

In 2022, Bullman created and directed Life and Death in the Warehouse. It was written by Helen Black.

Filmography

Documentaries

Dramas

References 

Year of birth missing (living people)
Living people
English film directors
English documentary filmmakers